Die Horen (The Horae) was a monthly German literary journal published from 1795 to 1797. It was printed by the Cotta publishing house in Tübingen and edited and run by Friedrich Schiller. Many and partially antagonistic prominent figures in German culture of the time contributed, among them Johann Jakob Engel, Fichte, Goethe, Herder, Alexander von Humboldt,  Wilhelm von Humboldt, Friedrich Heinrich Jacobi, Johann Heinrich Meyer, August Wilhelm Schlegel, and Karl Ludwig von Woltmann. The journal formed the cornerstone of Weimar Classicism and exerted a great influence onto German intellectual history.

References

1795 establishments in the Holy Roman Empire
1797 disestablishments in Europe
Classicism
Defunct literary magazines published in Germany
German-language magazines
Magazines established in 1795
Magazines disestablished in 1797
Mass media in Tübingen
Monthly magazines published in Germany
Works by Friedrich Schiller